Made Man is the third studio album by American rapper Silkk the Shocker, released on January 19, 1999, on Priority Records and Master P's No Limit Records. Production for the album was handled by No Limit producers Beats By the Pound. The album features guest appearances from Snoop Dogg, Mýa, Jay-Z, and Master P, the latter whom executive produced the album.

The album debuted at number one on both the US Billboard 200 and Top R&B/Hip-Hop Albums.  On April 12, 1999 Made Man was certified Platinum by the Recording Industry Association of America.

The music video for "Ghetto Rain" was also No Limit's first animated claymation music video.

Commercial Performance
It debuted at number one on the US Billboard 200 selling 240,244 copies in its first week making it Silkk the Shocker's Second Platinum album and his first platinum album debuting at number one on the US Billboard 200. It sold more its first week than his previous album Charge It 2 da Game (1998). Made Man went on to be certified Platinum by the Recording Industry Association of America (RIAA) in April 1999. This album made Silkk The Shocker one of the only rappers to go platinum with two albums within a 1 year time span, the other was DMX in 1998.

Track listing 

All lyrics written by Vyshonn "Silkk the Shocker" Miller, and featured rappers.

Charts

Weekly charts

Year-end charts

Singles

Personnel
Credits adapted from Allmusic
Craig B. - Producer  
C-Murder -   Performer,
Fiend - Performer  
Ghetto Commission  -  Performer  
Leslie Henderson-  Photography  
Jay-Z - CGuest Artist, Performer  
Master P -   Guest Artist, Performer, 
Mia X -  Guest Artist, Performer,
Mýa - Featured Artist, Guest Artist, Primary Artist  
Mystikal  - Guest Artist, Performer,  
O'Dell - Featured Artist, Performer,  
Rico - Featured Artist, Guest Artist, Performer, Primary Artist  
Silkk the Shocker - Performer  
Snoop Dogg -  Guest Artist, Performer,
Sons of Funk -  Guest Artist, Performer 
Carlos Stephens - Producer

See also
 Number-one albums of 1999 (U.S.)
 List of number-one R&B albums of 1999 (U.S.)
 No Limit Records discography

References

Silkk the Shocker albums
1999 albums
Priority Records albums
No Limit Records albums